Anredera vesicaria, common names Texas madeiravine or sacasile, and the related A. cordifolia are the only two species of the family Basellaceae known to occur in the wild in the contiguous United States. Both are sometimes cultivated for their showy and fragrant floral displays. Anredera cordifolia is widespread throughout the warmer regions of the world. Anredera vesicaria is native to Texas as well as to Mexico, Central America, West Indies, and Venezuela and it is introduced in Florida. In Texas and Florida the species grows in thickets and in disturbed areas such as roadsides and fence rows at elevations less than 500 m (1650 feet).

Anredera vesicaria is an herbaceous, twining vine that can reach a height of 8 m (27 feet). It has small, cream-colored flowers less than 2 mm (0.08 inches) across but borne in large racemes or panicles as much as 70 cm (28 inches) long. The flowers produce an intense and pleasant scent.

References

Basellaceae
Flora of Texas
Flora of Florida
Flora of Mexico
Flora of Venezuela
Flora of the Caribbean
Plants described in 1792
Flora without expected TNC conservation status